Valerie D'Orazio (born February 23, 1974) is an American comic book writer and editor.

Career
D'Orazio was hired as assistant editor at Acclaim in 1997. She joined the Creative Services Department at DC Comics in 2000. In 2002, she became assistant editor to Editorial Art Director Mark Chiarello on titles such as Aquaman, Batman: Black and White, and JLA.

After leaving DC in 2004, D'Orazio began a career as a blogger under a variety of pseudonyms. In 2006, she wrote an autobiographical series about her experiences with sexism in the American comic book industry, fandom and her health struggles entitled Goodbye to Comics.

D'Orazio wrote three stories for Marvel Comics: Punisher MAX: Butterfly, X-Men Origins: Emma Frost and a short story for Girl Comics (mini-series). She also wrote two stories for Bluewater Comics: Beyond: Edward Snowden, and Beyond: The Joker: The Man Who Laughs.

From 2010 to 2013, she was the editor of MTV.com subsidiary MTV Geek.

D'Orazio was President of Friends of Lulu, a non-profit organization that promoted women comic book creators and readers. She served from 2007-2010, after which the group was disbanded.

She was married to comic book writer David Gallaher.

See also
List of women comics writers and artists
List of American comics creators

References

External links

American bloggers
Comics critics
Female comics writers
Living people
Valiant Comics
Place of birth missing (living people)
American women bloggers
American comics writers
American writers of Italian descent
1974 births
21st-century American women